Xylophis perroteti, commonly known as Perrotet's mountain snake and the striped narrow-headed snake, is a species of snake in the family Pareidae. The species is endemic to the Western Ghats of India.

Etymology
Both the specific name, perroteti, and the common name, Perrotet's mountain snake, are in honor of French naturalist George Samuel Perrottet.

Geographic range
X. perroteti is found in the Western Ghats in the Indian states of Kerala and Tamil Nadu.

Habitat

Reproduction
X. perroteti is oviparous.

References

Further reading
Boulenger GA (1890). The Fauna of British India, Ceylon and Burma. Reptilia and Batrachia. London: Secretary of State for India in Council. (Taylor and Francis, printers). xviii + 541 pp. (Xylophis perroteti, new combination, pp. 283–284).
Duméril AMC, Bibron G, Duméril AHA (1854). Erpétologie générale ou histoire naturelle complète des reptiles. Tome septième. Première partie [Volume 7, Part 1]. Comprenant l'histoire des serpents non venimeux. Paris: Roret. xvi + 780 pp. (Platypteryx perroteti, new species, pp. 501–503). (in French).
Günther A (1858). Catalogue of Colubrine Snakes in the Collection of the British Museum. London: Trustees of the British Museum. (Taylor and Francis, printers). xvi + 281 pp. (Rhabdosoma microcephalum, pp. 12–13).
Jerdon TC (1865). "Remarks on observations contained in Dr. Günther's work on the reptiles of British India". Annals and Magazine of Natural History, Third Series 15: 416–418. (Platypteryx perroteti ).
Smith MA (1943). The Fauna of British India, Ceylon and Burma, Including the Whole of the Indo-Chinese Sub-region. Reptilia and Amphibia. Vol. III.—Serpentes. London: Secretary of State for India. (Taylor and Francis, printers). xii + 583 pp. (Xylophis perroteti, pp. 342–343).

Pareidae
Snakes of Asia
Reptiles of India
Endemic fauna of the Western Ghats
Reptiles described in 1854
Taxa named by Gabriel Bibron
Taxa named by André Marie Constant Duméril
Taxa named by Auguste Duméril